The 2018 Sutton Council election took place on 3 May 2018 to elect members of Sutton Council in London. This was on the same day as other local elections.

Results
The Liberal Democrats retained control winning 33 seats (−12) with the Conservatives winning 18 seats (+9) and independent candidates winning 3 seats from the Liberal Democrats in Beddington North.

|}

Ward results

Beddington North

Beddington South

Belmont

Carshalton Central

Carshalton South and Clockhouse

Cheam

Nonsuch

As James McDermott-Hill (Conservative) and Samantha Bourne (Lib Dems) were tied on 1,405 votes each.  Lots were drawn and McDermott-Hill won the seat.

St Helier

Stonecot

Sutton Central

Sutton North

Sutton South

Sutton West

The Wrythe

Wallington North

Wallington South

Wandle Valley

Worcester Park

By-Elections

References

2018 London Borough council elections
2018